Cyperus ekmanii is a species of sedge that is native to an area of Cuba.

The species was first formally described by the botanist Georg Kükenthal in 1926.

See also
 List of Cyperus species

References

ekmanii
Plants described in 1926
Taxa named by Georg Kükenthal
Flora of Cuba
Flora without expected TNC conservation status